This is a list of airports in Ghana, sorted by location.



List

See also 
 Transport in Ghana
 List of airports by ICAO code: D#DG - Ghana
 Wikipedia: WikiProject Aviation/Airline destination lists: Africa#Ghana

References

External links 
 Lists of airports in Ghana:
 Great Circle Mapper
 Aircraft Charter World
 World Aero Data

 
Ghana
Airports
Airlines
Ghana